The Walter S. and Melissa E. Barnes House is a historic house at 140 Highland Avenue in Somerville, Massachusetts.  Built about 1890, it is one of the city's least-altered examples of Queen/Stick style Victorian architecture.  It was for many years home to Robert Luce, a one-term Lieutenant Governor of Massachusetts.  It was listed on the National Register of Historic Places in 1990.

Description and history
The Barnes House stands in central Somerville, on the south side of Highland Avenue (a major east–west route through the city) between Central Street and Trull Lane.  It is a -story wood-frame structure, with a hip roof and clapboarded exterior.  The roof faces each have dormers, the one in front extended in width to a triangular shaped, and nearly filled by a half-round window.  The main roof eaves are bracketed, and there are Stick-style braces on the square posts supporting the front porch.  The porch has a shed roof, and wraps around to the right side to a projecting section.

The house was built sometime between about 1885 and 1895, and is one of a few virtually unchanged Queen Anne/Stick style Victorians in the city.  It was built for Walter S. Barnes, who worked in the box-making business in Boston.  It was home for many years to the family of Robert Luce (1862–1945), a prominent local politician.  Luce, a Republican, served many years in the United States Congress representing Somerville, and served a single term (1912–13) as Lieutenant Governor of Massachusetts.

See also
National Register of Historic Places listings in Somerville, Massachusetts

References

Houses on the National Register of Historic Places in Somerville, Massachusetts
Houses completed in 1885
Queen Anne architecture in Massachusetts
Shingle Style architecture in Massachusetts